Coleophora linosyris is a moth of the family Coleophoridae. It is found in France, Italy, Austria, the Czech Republic, Slovakia, Hungary and Romania.

The larvae feed on the leaves of Crinitaria linosyris. They feed on the generative organs of their host plant.

References

linosyris
Moths described in 1937
Moths of Europe